The 13th AARP Movies for Grownups Awards, presented by AARP the Magazine, honored films released in 2013 and were announced on January 9, 2014. The awards recognized films created by and about people over the age of 50. The ceremony, held a month later on February 10, 2014, was hosted by actress and comedian Kathy Griffin.

Awards

Winners and nominees

Winners are listed first, highlighted in boldface, and indicated with a double dagger.

Career Achievement Award
 Susan Sarandon

Breakthrough Accomplishment
 Mary Steenburgen: "She's already won an Oscar and is one of TV's most welcome faces; now, for her role as an aspiring Vegas lounge singer, Steenburgen, 60, reveals herself to be a first-rate vocalist (and she even wrote her own song)."

Films with multiple nominations and awards

References

AARP Movies for Grownups Awards
AARP